Irina Solontsova-Kudryavtseva (born 9 February 1937) is a Soviet athlete. She competed in the women's shot put at the 1968 Summer Olympics.

References

1937 births
Living people
Athletes (track and field) at the 1968 Summer Olympics
Soviet female shot putters
Olympic athletes of the Soviet Union
Place of birth missing (living people)